Navalagamella is a municipality of the Community of Madrid, Spain.

References

See also 

 Imperial Route of the Community of Madrid

Municipalities in the Community of Madrid